Ronivaldo ("Roni") Santos Conceição (born July 8, 1972 in São Paulo) is a professional male squash player who represented Brazil during his career. He reached a career-high world ranking of World No. 95 in October 2006 after having joined the Professional Squash Association in 2001.

External links
 Ronivaldo Conceição at UOL Esporte - Pan 2007 
 
 

1972 births
Living people
Brazilian male squash players
Pan American Games silver medalists for Brazil
Pan American Games bronze medalists for Brazil
Pan American Games medalists in squash
Squash players at the 1999 Pan American Games
Squash players at the 2003 Pan American Games
Squash players at the 2007 Pan American Games
South American Games silver medalists for Brazil
South American Games bronze medalists for Brazil
South American Games medalists in squash
Sportspeople from São Paulo
Competitors at the 2010 South American Games
Medalists at the 1999 Pan American Games
Medalists at the 2003 Pan American Games
Medalists at the 2007 Pan American Games
20th-century Brazilian people
21st-century Brazilian people